Jostin Alexis Alarcón Paquiyauri (born 12 July 2002) is a Peruvian footballer who plays as a forward for Sport Boys.

Career statistics

Club

Notes

References

2002 births
Living people
Footballers from Lima
Peruvian footballers
Association football forwards
Peruvian Primera División players
Deportivo Municipal footballers
Sport Boys footballers